is a Japanese drama film written by Kundō Koyama and directed by Yōjirō Takita that was released in 2008. Based on the book Coffinman by Aoki Shinmon, it follows a young man, Daigo Kobayashi (Masahiro Motoki), who loses his job as a cellist and moves back to his hometown. Despite objections from his wife Mika (Ryōko Hirosue), he finds fulfilment in performing traditional encoffinment ceremonies with his boss, Sasaki (Tsutomu Yamazaki), and his coworker, Kamimura (Kimiko Yo).

The film was premiered by Shochiku in Japan on 13 September, with a North American release on 29 May 2009 and a British one on 4 December. Owing to traditional Japanese taboos about death, Takita did not expect the film to be a success. However, Departures was the highest-grossing domestic film of 2008 in Japan, earning ¥3.05 billion in box office revenue, and a total of $69,932,387 worldwide. The film was also well received by critics, with an approval rating of 81% on the review aggregator Rotten Tomatoes; reviewer Roger Ebert described it as "excellent at achieving the universal ends of narrative".

International awards for Departures began to accrue before its domestic release, when the film was granted the Grand Prix des Ameriques at the Montreal World Film Festival. Over the next several months it received multiple awards, including four from Kinema Junpo, and in September 2008 it was selected as Japan's submission for the Academy Award for Best Foreign Language Film. In February 2009, Departures dominated the Japan Academy Prizes, receiving thirteen nominations and winning ten. During the 81st Academy Awards held later that week, Departures became the first Japanese submission to win the Oscar for Best Foreign Language Film, over the critical favourite Waltz with Bashir (Ari Folman). Into 2010 Departures picked up several further awards, including Best Asian Film at the Hong Kong Film Awards.

This international success led to the development of a tourism industry based around the film, with some sites receiving thousands of visitors, and stimulated both a theatrical re-release and a reprint of Coffinman. A hearse based on Kobayashi and Sasaki's vehicle in the film was likewise put into production.

Accolades

Explanatory notes

References

External links
 

Lists of accolades by film